Dávid Kulcsár (born 25 February 1988, in Miskolc) is a Hungarian football player who plays for III. Kerületi TVE.

Club statistics

Updated to games played as of 15 May 2021.

References
HLSZ
Ferencvarosi TC Official Website

1988 births
Living people
Sportspeople from Miskolc
Hungarian footballers
Hungary youth international footballers
Association football midfielders
Diósgyőri VTK players
Ferencvárosi TC footballers
Vecsés FC footballers
Vasas SC players
Paksi FC players
III. Kerületi TUE footballers
Nemzeti Bajnokság I players